Amina Aqdas (died 1893) was a royal consort of shah Naser al-Din Shah Qajar of Persia (r. 1848–1896).

She was the daughter of an impoverished shepherd in a from a village near Garrūs in Kurdistan, and was employed as a free maidservant to the shah's wife Anīs-al-dawla in the Qajar harem in 1859.

She eventually became a favorite of the shah, second only to Anīs-al-dawla. Contemporaries attributed her influence to an ability to manipulate of the shah's weak spots: she catered to his whims, encouraged his obsessions, and appealed to his parsimony. Her power was also enhanced by the shah's intense attachment to her nephew, Gholam-Ali, Malijak-e Thani, also known as Aziz Al-Soltan. She supported the career of Mirza Ali Asghar Khan Amin al-Soltan. She was entrusted with several important responsibilities, such assupervising the shah's private apartment, where the crown jewels were kept; keeping the shah's most important seal, and put in charge of all presents given to the shah.

In 1890, she became the first royal consort to visit the West, when she went to Europe to have treatment for her eye condition, a journey which was widely criticised by the olama. During her last three years, she was paralyzed due to a stroke.

References

1893 deaths
Qajar royal consorts
19th-century Iranian women